Crimson Cowl is an identity which has been used by four Marvel Comics characters to varying degrees:

Ultron used the identity in his debut as Ultron-5 to conceal his sentience, while using:
Edwin Jarvis as a "frontman" under the identity.
Crimson Cowl (Justine Hammer), the daughter of Justin Hammer later used the identity to lead a team of Masters of Evil and bedevil the Thunderbolts, at one time framing:
Dallas Riordan, placing her in the costume with a teleporter, a deception which held for some time.